Ronnie James Tucker, better known by his stage name Ro James, is an American singer and songwriter. He is known for his single "Permission", which reached number 37 on the US Hot R&B/Hip-Hop Songs chart. He is signed to ByStorm Entertainment/RCA Records and released Eldorado, his first album under a major label, in 2016.

Career
Born in Stuttgart, West Germany, James is of Panamanian and African-American descent. Throughout his childhood, James would sing regularly, but never in public. He eventually moved to New York where he was influenced by his aunt Rosie Gaines, a former singer for Prince. His love for the album Purple Rain landed him in a studio at the age of 19. His skills as a songwriter began with the song "Portrait", leading up to a credit on the single "Use Me" by R&B singer Miguel after forming a bond with him on MySpace.

James performed in and around New York with artists such as Luke James and Wynter Gordon. In 2013 he released his first EP, a three-part entitled Coke, Jack and Cadillacs. Each part represented important themes in his life - first love, first drink, first car. The EP featured songs that included "A.D.I.D.A.S." and "Pledge Allegiance". It also featured Asher Roth on the song "Lisa". James signed with ByStorm Entertainment/RCA Records in 2015 and subsequently released "Permission", his first single from a major record label, reaching number 37 on the US Hot R&B/Hip-Hop Songs chart. His debut album, Eldorado was released May 27, 2016. It debuted at number 71 on the US Billboard 200 and at number eight on the US Top R&B/Hip-Hop Albums. It subsequently earned him his first nomination for Best R&B Performance at the 59th Grammy Awards in February 2017.

Discography

Albums

EPs

Singles

Tours

Headlining tour 
XIX Tour (2017)

Co-headlining tour 
The R&B Tour (with BJ The Chicago Kid) (2018)

Notes

References

External links
 

Living people
RCA Records artists
Musicians from Stuttgart
German rhythm and blues musicians
English-language singers from Germany
African-American male singer-songwriters
Year of birth missing (living people)
German emigrants to the United States